The Whizzer (Robert Frank) is a superhero appearing in American comic books published by Marvel Comics. He first appeared during the period called the Golden Age of Comic Books.

The Whizzer has super-speed powers, which (in his original origin story) he acquired from an infusion of mongoose blood. He appeared in both USA Comics and All Winners Comics from 1941 to 1946, and was revived by Marvel in the 1970s.

Publication history
Robert Frank's incarnation of the Whizzer debuted in U.S.A. Comics #1 (Aug. 1941), published by Timely Comics. The character was created by penciller Al Avison and an unnamed writer. One source credits Stan Lee as that writer, but there are no other sources to support the credit. (Lee and artist Paul Reinman did sign the Whizzer story in All-Winners Comics #2, and in #3 as "Neel Nats," which is illustrated by Mike Sekowsky.) The Whizzer appeared regularly in U.S.A. Comics through issue #17 (Sept 1945).

At the same time, he was also appearing regularly in All Winners Comics, from issue #2 (Sept 1941) through #21 (Dec 1946). In issues #19 and #21, he was part of the All Winners Squad, a superteam that also included Captain America, Bucky Barnes, the Human Torch, Toro, the Sub-Mariner and Miss America. These were the character's last appearances during the 1940s.

Writer Roy Thomas reintroduced the Golden Age Whizzer in Giant-Size Avengers #1 (Aug. 1974). Two years later, in The Avengers Annual #6 (Nov. 1976), writer Gerry Conway reinterpreted the character's origin and history so that the "transfusion of mongoose blood" was not the source of the power, but the factor that "triggered a latent mutant ability". Thomas, in the World War II flashback series The Invaders #5–6 (March–May 1976), expanded on the character's wartime career as a sometime-member of the retroactively created superhero team the Invaders. Thomas later additionally made the Whizzer a full-time member of the home-front heroes the Liberty Legion, in Marvel Premiere #29–30 (April–June 1976). Neither team had existed in Timely Comics.

Fictional character biography
Robert L. Frank was born in St. Louis, Missouri. The origin of the Golden Age character begins while Bob Frank and his father, Dr. Emil Frank, are framed for murder of a man named Jennings by Granno, who brought the shot Jennings with his lackey, Spike, who will serve as witness, so they flee to Africa where Bob gets sick from fever and in need of a blood transfusion. While Bob is unconscious, he is approached by a cobra, but is saved by the sudden attack of a mongoose. Dr. Frank saves Robert by a transfusion of the mongoose's blood, and soon discovers that his son has developed super-speed, but the stress kills Dr. Frank. After beating Granno and his lackeys unconscious and reporting them to the D.A., Frank then decides to fight crime and eventually accepts the offer of Invaders member Bucky, who forms the superhero team the Liberty Legion to rescue the other Invaders, who have been brainwashed by the villain the Red Skull. When the Liberty Legion and Invaders eventually disband after World War II, the Whizzer joins the newly formed All-Winners Squad.

The Whizzer afterward spent some years battling alcoholism and depression and was, for some time, homeless in the Bowery section of Manhattan. He also works as a nuclear laboratory technician.

In 1942, the Whizzer acquired a new sidekick, a stereotyped African-American friend named Slow-Motion Jones.

In the modern age, the Whizzer reappears as an aging hero who had married fellow superhero Miss America. The Whizzer encounters and briefly serves with the Avengers, who aid him in controlling his son Nuklo. He is reunited with Nuklo, but suffers a heart attack. At the end of this adventure, the Whizzer erroneously believes himself to be the father of the mutant twins Quicksilver and Scarlet Witch.

The Whizzer was later duped by the Living Laser into battling the Avengers, and suffers a second heart attack. He then battled the Atlanteans and Namor alongside the Avengers. After a humbling defeat at the hands of the supervillain Count Nefaria the Whizzer retires.

He later returns to fight a final battle against an old war-time foe called Isbisa. The Whizzer dies after suffering a fatal heart attack while fighting Isbisa, but his sacrifice enables his son Nuklo to be cured of his excessive radiation level and begin a normal life. The Whizzer learned of the still birth of his actual twin babies on Wundagore, and learned he did not father The Scarlet Witch and Quicksilver, shortly before he died.

Arnim Zola later created a proto-husk of Whizzer from his DNA. The Whizzer clone has no lines and is killed by Deadpool who mocks him as "a legend to make mercs laugh at night".

Powers and abilities
Due to a reaction between his latent genetic mutation and an injection of mongoose blood, Robert Frank has the ability to move at superhuman speed and has superhuman reflexes. He can create cyclones by running in circles, and can run up walls and across water. In his prime, he could attain speeds faster than he could in middle age, running at approximately 100 mph.

The Whizzer has learned a unique, self-taught fighting style that exploits the ability to move at superhuman speeds.

Enemies

Whizzer has had his own group of enemies during his superhero career:

 Granno - the mobster that forced him and his father to leave the country through frame-up 
 Black - Don Reinman is the prison warden of Tolegate Prison who became the skull-masked Black to set off a prison riot after discovering oil underneath Tolegate Prison.
 League of Petty Crime - A quartet of criminals led by the corrupt prison warden Balew.
 Leet Brannis - Leet Brannis was a gangster who operated from a local pawn shop. He and his men typically robbed jewelry stores and other places where they could get their hands on easy cash. Eventually, Whizzer caught onto Brannis and his men and foiled their plans.
 Lens - A Nazi spy who smuggled jewelry into North America that were tainted with a poison.
 Mr. Tho - The owner of radio relay stations who the Nazis swayed to their side where he had to bomb his own radio relay stations.
 Paul Smythe - A department store general manager who worked with Lens.
 Riko - A mob leader who led his mob into robbing a bank and trapping its employees in a vault.
 Triple Destruction - A Nazi saboteur who led his minions into blowing up the munitions plants.

Reception
 In 2018, CBR.com ranked Whizzer (Robert Frank) 25th in their "25 Fastest Characters In The Marvel Universe" list.
 In 2022, CBR.com ranked Whizzer 19th in their "Marvel: The 20 Fastest Speedsters" list.

Other versions

Amalgam
In the DC Comics/Marvel Comics jointly published Amalgam Comics miniseries, the Whiz is an amalgamation of the Robert Frank Whizzer and the Golden Age Flash, and is a member of the All Star Winners Squad. His sole appearance was in Super Soldier: Man of War #1 (June 1997).

Marvel Zombies
In Marvel Zombies 3, the zombified Whizzer appears alongside fellow speedsters Speed Demon and Quicksilver chasing down Machine Man before being killed after diving under Ghost Rider's bike, causing all four of the zombies to explode.

In other media
 An elderly, long-retired Robert Frank / Whizzer appears in the Spider-Man five-part episode "Six Forgotten Warriors", voiced by Walker Edmiston. This version gained his powers from an experiment meant to recreate the process that empowered Captain America alongside the Black Marvel, the Destroyer, Miss America, and the Thunderer during World War II. However, due to the limited nature of their powers, they had to use special rings to activate and regulate them.
 Robert Frank / Whizzer appears in the Ultimate Spider-Man episode "S.H.I.E.L.D. Academy", voiced by Robert Patrick. This version operated during World War II before becoming a teacher at the Triskelion's S.H.I.E.L.D. Academy.

References

External links
 Whizzer (Robert Frank) at Marvel.com
 Whizzer (Robert Frank) at Marvel Wiki
 Whizzer (Robert Frank) at Comic Vine

Comics characters introduced in 1941
Fictional characters from Missouri
Golden Age superheroes
Marvel Comics characters who can move at superhuman speeds
Marvel Comics male superheroes
Marvel Comics mutants
Marvel Comics mutates
Marvel Comics superheroes
Timely Comics characters